Out for a Kill is a 2003 straight-to-video action film directed by Michael Oblowitz. It stars Steven Seagal.

Plot
Wong Dai (Chooi Kheng Beh), an influential Chinese drug kingpin, sits at a long table in an old building in Paris, France, going through the motions of a gigantic merger between himself and several other major Chinese drug dealers.

Sai Lo (Hon Ping Tang) controls shipments in the French heroin market in Paris, using laundromats all over Paris as a front.

Tang "The Bird" Zhili (Bruce Wang) controls the entire New York drug conglomerate from the Chinatown section of New York City, and runs Mahjong gambling rackets.

Yin Quinshi (Dave Wong) of Sofia, Bulgaria, controls an Eastern European drug cartel.

Li Bo (Tom Wu) controls drug exports in Shanghai, China, and has a penchant for French restaurants.

Fang "The Barber" Lee (Ozzie Yue) controls a drug cartel in Paris, France, and he is known to hire unique assassins. And Mr. Chang (Chuke Chan) controls drug money in London, England.
Yale University archaeology professor Robert Burns (Steven Seagal), who has just recently won the Winthrop Award for excellence in archaeology, stumbles onto the fact that his expedition to China, near the China / Kazakhstan border, is being used by Wong as a cover for a drug smuggling operation.

Realizing the danger of sticking around, Burns and his assistant, Luo Yi (Elaine Tan), make a run for it, but in the resulting gunfight, Yi is killed.

When Burns reaches the border, he finds that Wong's smugglers have set him up for smuggling the drugs. Burns lands in a Chinese prison, framed for drug running.

Burns is questioned by Chinese narcotics cop Tommie Ling (Michelle Goh) and DEA agent Ed Gray (Corey Johnson), who want to release him and use him as bait to nail the drug smugglers.

Burns, referred to by the Chinese drug barons as the "gweilo Professor", is quickly released and sent to the USA, where he promises Yi's father Luo Dazhong (Vincent Wong) that he will get revenge for Yi's murder, but Wong is not done with Burns yet.

Wong sends hitmen to Burns's house in New Haven, Connecticut, to plant a bomb, which explodes and kills Burns's wife Maya (Kata Dobó).

With the two people closest to him dead at the hands of Wong and his minions, and with Tommie and Gray shadowing his every move, Burns is out for revenge.

As it turns out, Burns was not always a Professor. Burns was once a thief of Chinese artefacts, who served time in prison and earned his archaeology degree while in prison. He changed his name and married Maya after he was released.

With his determination to exterminate those who killed Maya, Burns tells Tommie and Gray to stay out of his way, as he cuts a bloody path through Chinatown and across Europe on his way to a confrontation with Wong.

Cast

Production
The film was one of two movies made by Seagal's own company, Luminosity Media, in association with Emmett/Furla Films Productions Corporation, a wholly owned subsidiary of Family Room Entertainment Corporation. The other film was Belly of the Beast.

Filming began in Eastern Europe on 15 September.
Actor Rachel Grant later claimed Seagal assaulted her during rehearsals for the film.

Stuntman actor Sam Cam Lui was awarded £10,000 after he was injured in a fight scene with Seagal during filming.

Reception
Den of Geek wrote that "the special effects are dreadful; bad ideas that look cheap and unconvincing. The story follows as though the script was tossed into the air and the pages put back together in the wrong order. Fortunately, the tone is light and the silliness passes as good fun. There are a couple of great fight scenes, too. My favourite part of the film sees Seagal fighting a guy who bizarrely develops the ability to crawl along walls, mid-brawl. Obviously, Seagal smashes him to pieces regardless. We also get lots of scenes set in strip club, because of course, and plenty of Seagal shooting."

References

External links
 
 
 
 

2003 direct-to-video films
2003 films
2003 action films
American action films
American direct-to-video films
Nu Image films
MoviePass Films films
Films directed by Michael Oblowitz
Triad films
2000s English-language films
2000s American films
2000s Hong Kong films